"Cucurucu" is a song by English musician Nick Mulvey. The song was released on 3 March 2014.

Mulvey told The Cambridge News that the song's title is meaningless. "It's meant to be a noise a child would make," he explained. "It might relate to a bird sound too. It's actually quite similar to the noise they make in France for a cockerel. You know how we say 'cock-a-doodle-do'? Over there it's like that Cucurucu."

"At its core it's my adaptation of DH Lawrence's poem Piano," Mulvey added. "The poem depicts a child under the piano, smiling as its mother sings, so I thought it would be lovely to have a song within the song. So I'm singing in her voice, really, and then I got the chorus about 'yearning to belong', so it's not just putting his words to my music. At first I was bothered by that, because I didn't think I should've changed it, but I've got used to it."

Track listings
Digital download
"Cucurucu" – 4:26

Charts

Certifications

Release history

References

External links
 

2014 singles
2014 songs